John Percy Phair (1 November 1876 – 28 December 1967) was a 20th-century Anglican bishop.

Educated at Trinity College, Dublin, Phair was ordained in 1900. He held curacies in Conwall, Dublin and Monkstown and incumbencies in  St Catherine's Dublin and Christ Church Leeson Park. He was Rural Dean of Rathdowney and then Dean of Ossory (1923–1940)  before becoming Bishop of Ossory, Ferns and Leighlin in 1940. He retired in 1961; and died on 28 December 1967.

References

1876 births
1947 deaths
Alumni of Trinity College Dublin
Deans of Ossory
Deans of Leighlin
Bishops of Ossory, Ferns and Leighlin
20th-century Anglican bishops in Ireland